James Leonard Bacchus (born June 21, 1949) is an American lawyer, businessman, and politician who served as a member of the U.S. House of Representatives from Florida from 1991 to 1995. He was a founding member and twice chairman of the Appellate Body of the World Trade Organization in Geneva, Switzerland from 1995 to 2003. He later became a fellow of the European Institute for International Law and International Relations.

Early life and career
Bacchus earned an undergraduate degree from Vanderbilt University, a Master of Arts in History from Yale University, and a Juris Doctor from the Florida State University College of Law, where he was editor-in-chief of the FSU Law Review.

From 1968 to 1973, Bacchus was a reporter and columnist for the Orlando Sentinel in Florida and Washington. From 1964 to 1967, he was a reporter for the Sanford Herald in Florida. He has enlisted service in the United States Army, the United States Army Reserve, the Connecticut National Guard, and the Florida National Guard, 1971-1977. From 1968 to 1973.

Bacchus was Deputy Press Secretary and Chief Speechwriter for Florida Governor Reubin Askew from 1974 to 1976. He became Askew's special assistant from 1979 to 1981, after Askew was appointed U.S. Trade Representative.

He served as Chairman of the WTO Appellate Body from 2001 to 2003. He was an attorney and partner with Akerman Senterfitt & Eidson, Orlando in Florida from 1984 to 1990. He was an attorney with Greenberg Traurig, P.A. in Miami, Florida in 1979 and again from 1981 to 1982.

He later co-authored the “Sunshine Amendment” to the Florida Constitution for open and ethical government. This led to later roles addressing the nexus of economic and environmental issues as general counsel to Florida’s state growth planning commission and as chairman of community development efforts in his hometown of Orlando.

Tenure in Congress
In 1990, Bacchus was elected as a member of the Democratic Party to represent Florida's 11th congressional district in the 102nd Congress and Florida's 15th congressional district in the 103rd Congress in 1992. His districts included Orlando, Cape Canaveral, and much of East Central Florida.

Bacchus was an active member of Congressional committees on science, space, technology, banking, and other financial services. He also served as a member of the select committee on children. He was a lead sponsor and supporter of the International Space Station, the Space Shuttle, the successful repair mission to the Hubble Space Telescope, and numerous other legislative initiatives involving public and private space exploration.

Bacchus sponsored legislation establishing the Archie Carr National Wildlife Refuge for endangered sea turtles, expanding the Pelican Island National Wildlife Refuge (the nation’s oldest), and restoring the natural flow of the Kissimmee River into the Florida Everglades.

Bacchus was the original co-sponsor of the implementing legislation for the Uruguay Round of multilateral trade agreements establishing the World Trade Organization and leading supporter of numerous other trade initiatives, including the North American Free Trade Agreement and normal trade relations with China.

Career after Congress
Bacchus was a founding member and twice chairman of the Appellate Body of the World Trade Organization in Geneva, Switzerland, from 1995 to 2003. The WTO dispute settlement system resolves international disputes involving more than 98% of all world commerce. Bacchus was nominated on a bipartisan basis by the United States and twice appointed to the Appellate Body by consensus of the now 164 countries that are members of the WTO. Bacchus served eight years as a founding judge, the only American judge, and was one of the seven judges worldwide. He was twice elected as Chairman in 2002 and 2003. He helped establish the Appellate Body as a leading global tribunal and the WTO dispute settlement system as a leading framework for resolving international disputes and upholding the international rule of law.

On February 23, 2007, Bacchus was named to a Department of Defense panel reviewing the Walter Reed Army Medical Center neglect scandal.

Bacchus was Chair of the Global Practice of Greenberg Traurig, P.A. with offices in Orlando, Florida, and Washington, D.C., from 2004 to 2017. He currently serves as a Distinguished University Professor of Global Affairs and the Director of the Center for Global Economic and Environmental Opportunity at the University of Central Florida.

Other professional activities
Bacchus was a member of the High Level Advisory Panel to the President of the Conference of Parties of the United Nations Framework Convention on Climate Change from 2014 to 2016. He has served as Chairman of the Commission on Trade and Investment Policy of the Paris-based International Chamber of Commerce since 2012. He has been a “B20” business adviser to the “G20” heads of state on the international economy, since 2014. He served as Chair of the Global Agenda Council on Governance for Sustainability of the Davos-based World Economic Forum from 2012 to 2014. He was a member of the Global Future Council on Trade and Foreign Direct Investment of the World Economic Forum from 2011 to 2012 and since 2014. He was a member of the Board of Directors of the “E15” Initiative and chair of the global expert group on trade and climate change for the Geneva-based International Center for Trade and Sustainable Development from 2014 to 2015. He has been a member of the Bretton Woods Committee since 1995, and elected life member of the Council on Foreign Relations since 1995. He has been a member of the list of arbitration chairpersons under the CARIFORUM Economic Partnership Agreement between the European Union and the Caribbean CARIFORUM states since 2016.

Electoral history

References
A Trade War With Zero Currency

Free Trade Should Be Part of the Stimulus Plan

Diverting A U.S.-China Trade War

China In The Dock: The WTO cracks down on counterfeiting

External links
Profile from Greenberg Traurig

 

1949 births
Members of the Appellate Body
Living people
People from Nashville, Tennessee
Florida State University College of Law alumni
Democratic Party members of the United States House of Representatives from Florida
Members of Congress who became lobbyists